Kwangwoon University station (formerly Seongbuk station) is a train station on Seoul Subway Line 1, Gyeongchun Line and Gyeongwon Line in Seoul, South Korea operated by Korail. Together with Incheon station and Suwon station, this station was one of the three termini of Line 1 when it opened in 1974. Seongbuk Depot, one of the five depots of Line 1, is located nearby.

Renaming
Seongbuk station was renamed  to Kwangwoon University station on February 25, 2013. It was formerly subnamed Kwangwoon University.

References

Seoul Metropolitan Subway stations
Metro stations in Nowon District
Railway stations opened in 1939
Seoul Subway Line 1